Aspergillus deoxyribonuclease K1 (Aspergillus DNase K1) is an enzyme. This enzyme catalyses the following chemical reaction

 Endonucleolytic cleavage to nucleoside 3'-phosphates and 3'-phosphooligonucleotide end-products

This enzyme has preference for single-stranded DNA.

References

External links 
 

EC 3.1.22